Alyoshino is a rural locality (a selo) in Yegoryevsky District of Moscow Oblast, Russia.

In the Russian Empire, it was a part of Nechayevskaya Volost of Yegoryevsky Uyezd of Ryazan Governorate.  Postal code: 140320.

Old Believers' (Russian Orthodox Old-Rite Church) Saint George church in Alyoshino was built in 1886-1889 with the Yegoryevsk's city head and the manufacturer Nikifor Bardygin's own money.

On October 24, 2004, sanctified by the decision of the Council of Russian Orthodox Old-Rite Church, Monastery of the Signs of Our Lady was opened in Alyoshino.

References

External links
Михайлов С. С. "Из истории связей Егорьевского уезда Рязанской губернии и Гуслиц". Вестник Российского Фольклорного Союза. №3 (14). 2005. Стр. 12-17.
Старообрядческий монастырь в Алёшино. Альманах "Гуслицы". Вып. 2. 2005.

Rural localities in Moscow Oblast
Old Believer communities in Russia